BrandMoxie is a marketing and advertising agency managed by Sana Bagersh. It is based in the twofour54 media center in Abu Dhabi, UAE.

In 2009, BrandMoxie released its Tamakkan entrepreneurship platform, and published the first issue of Tempo Magazine.

In 2011, it introduced (through Tempo) its Planetarians program, covering topics on individual engagement in preservation of resources, conservation and sustainability.

In 2012, it introduced The Dream Players, an initiative providing talent scouting and public event exposure for performers. In April 2015, it introduced The Smovies, a short-film competition to identify talented filmmakers and give them exposure through cinema theatres.

Corporate social responsibility
BrandMoxie collaborated with Sorbonne University in Abu Dhabi to create The Abu Dhabi International Poetry Festival in March 2015.

In partnership with Vox Cinemas, its annual competition The Smovies has recognized and promoted emerging filmmakers since 2015.

BrandMoxie's monthly Tempo magazine promotes the arts, creativity and innovation, and provides a common ground for the UAE's many cultures.

Products
Branding:

 Al Manhal, Tahdeed, Seba Tower, Abu Dhabi Pensions Fund, Carina Views

Motion Graphics:

 Comparix, British School Al Khubeirat, LIWA, Summer in Abu Dhabi, Half Empty, Musa Hamati

Print Design:

 Halwa and Gahwa, Liwa, Sheikh Zayed Mosque, ADTA, AMCHAM Abu Dhabi

Partners
 Tamakkan
 The Embassy of The United States of America in Abu Dhabi
 The Abu Dhabi International Poetry Festival
 The Smovies
 Vox Cinemas

References

Advertising agencies of the United Arab Emirates